The Community of Scholars is a 1962 book about higher education by Paul Goodman with his observations on its function and proposals for its future.

The book influenced the free university experiments of the 1960s counterculture.

References

Further reading

External links 

 

1962 non-fiction books
American non-fiction books
Books about higher education
Books about anarchism
Books by Paul Goodman
English-language books
Random House books